This is a list of presidential trips made by Abdullah Gül, the 11th President of Republic of Turkey. During his presidency, which began with his inauguration on August 28, 2007, Abdullah Gül has travelled to 63 different states internationally as of February 2014.

Summary of international trips

2007
The following international trips were made by Abdullah Gül during 2007:

2008
The following international trips were made by Abdullah Gül during 2008:

2009
The following international trips were made by Abdullah Gül during 2009:

References

State visits by Turkish presidents
Lists of diplomatic trips
Lists of 21st-century trips
Diplomatic visits by heads of state
Gül